Hanbi Trail is a trail in Sun Moon Lake, Yuchi Township, Nantou County, Taiwan.

History
The trail used to be the path in which President Chiang Kai-shek and his wife Soong Mei-ling used to walk every time they visited the area.

Architecture
The entrance of the path is located at Meihe Garden. The path is 2 km long and it is relatively not too steep. It is made of red bricks.

See also
 List of roads in Taiwan

References

Hiking trails in Taiwan
Tourist attractions in Nantou County